The Indochinese bush lark (Mirafra erythrocephala) or Indochinese lark is a species of lark in the family Alaudidae found in southeast Asia.

Taxonomy and systematics 
Following work a decade ago by Per Alström, the Indochinese bush lark was split from the Bengal Bush Lark to form a separate species.

Distribution and habitat 
The range of the Indochinese bush lark extends over a large swath of southeast Asia, and can be found in Myanmar, Thailand, Cambodia, Vietnam, and Laos.

The Indochinese bush lark is found in a variety of open-space habitats up to 900 m interspersed with trees and shrubs and has adapted to cultivated land. It also exists at forest margins, as well as thickets of bamboo.

References 

Indochinese bush lark
Birds of Southeast Asia
Indochinese bush lark
Taxonomy articles created by Polbot